Elizabeth Jane "Liz" Cain (born 29 December 1962 in Sydney) is an Australian former pair skater and current figure skating coach. With brother Peter Cain, she is the 1976 World Junior bronze medalist and four time Australian national champion. Their highest placement at the World Figure Skating Championships was 12th, in 1977. They competed in the 1980 Winter Olympics, finishing eleventh. She is the mother and coach of Australian national champion Sean Carlow.

On 28 March 2007, Cain and several members of the Australian figure skating team were in a small boat on Sydney Harbour near the Harbor Bridge when it collided with a ferry.  Cain lost her leg in the accident, which has become known as the Sydney Harbour fatal ferry crash. However, her life was saved by her son, who jumped into the water and held her until rescuers could arrive. She has since returned to coaching. Due to her accident, she wears a prosthetic leg.

Results
(with Cain)

References

Skatabase: 1980s Olympics
Skatabase: 1970s Worlds

External links
Brisbane Times article on the crash
Article on accident from Swedish newspaper Aftonbladet
Article on crash (pl)

Australian female pair skaters
Australian amputees
Figure skaters at the 1980 Winter Olympics
Olympic figure skaters of Australia
1962 births
Living people
Sportswomen from New South Wales
World Junior Figure Skating Championships medalists
Figure skaters from Sydney